is a Kuiper-belt object. The object is classified as a cubewano. It is near a 2:3 resonance with Neptune.

Brown estimates it is likely a dwarf planet based on its presumed size, calculated from its absolute magnitude (H) and assumed albedo.

Orbit and rotation 

Based on an integration of its motion over 10 million years,  has been classified as a classical Kuiper belt object (cubewano). It is near a 2:3 resonance with Neptune. The object is currently at 39 AU from the Sun.

Physical properties 

The mass of the object is currently unknown but should be greater than about 3 kg.

 has a moderately red slope in the visible spectral range. Its visible spectrum does not show any features, although there is a small departure from the linearity near 0.8 μm.

See also

References

External links 
 

Plutinos
2004 UX10
2004 UX10
2004 UX10
Possible dwarf planets
20041020